Hal Willis (born Léonald Francis Gauthier; July 15, 1933 – September 4, 2015) was a Canadian country singer who lived in Nashville, Tennessee, USA. He was born in Rouyn-Noranda, Quebec the youngest son of Alfred and Evelina Gauthier.

Career
His famous country single was "The Lumberjack," an international hit that sold over 1.5 million copies. In 1965, it peaked at number 5 on the Billboard country charts in the USA. This success was such a phenomenon that he was nicknamed "Mr. Lumberjack."

His popularity started rising in 1956 when he and his wife, Ginger Willis, were hired by Colonel Tom Parker to tour with the music phenomenon of the hour, Elvis Presley. At this time, Hal and Ginger were also rock and roll singers recording songs like "My Pink Cadillac" and "Bop a Dee Bop a Doo." Hal and Ginger, along with Hank Snow, were the only Canadian performers to tour with Elvis Presley. He also performed and toured through his career with many American Country Music Hall of Fame singers such as Patsy Cline, Webb Pierce, Loretta Lynn, Dolly Parton, Porter Wagoner, Johnny Cash and Willie Nelson.

Hal and Ginger Willis were inducted into the Canadian Country Music Hall of Fame in 2010.

On May 27, 2012, Hal Willis was also inducted to the Quebec Museum of Rock & Roll through a ceremony held in Rouyn-Noranda, Quebec, Canada at the international Festival des guitares du monde de l'Abitibi-Témiscamingue.

In March 2013, at the age of 79 years, Hal Willis released a new single "Working in the Goldmine".

Death
Willis died in Nashville, Tennessee on September 4, 2015.

Discography

Studio albums

Singles

References

External links
 Hal Willis' songs with BMI Music

1933 births
2015 deaths
Canadian country singer-songwriters
Canadian male singer-songwriters
French Quebecers
People from Rouyn-Noranda